Myscelia cyananthe, the blackened bluewing, is a species of tropical brushfoot in the butterfly family Nymphalidae. It is found in North America.

The MONA or Hodges number for Myscelia cyananthe is 4531.

Subspecies
These three subspecies belong to the species Myscelia cyananthe:
 Myscelia cyananthe cyananthe
 Myscelia cyananthe skinneri Mengel, 1894
 Myscelia cyananthe streckeri Skinner, 1889

References

Further reading

 

Biblidinae
Articles created by Qbugbot
Butterflies described in 1867
Butterflies of North America
Taxa named by Baron Cajetan von Felder
Taxa named by Rudolf Felder